Michal Teplý (born 27 May 2001) is a Czech professional ice hockey left winger currently playing with the Rockford IceHogs in the American Hockey League (AHL) as a prospect for the Chicago Blackhawks of the National Hockey League (NHL).

Playing career
Teplý was selected 105th overall in the 2019 NHL Entry Draft by the Chicago Blackhawks. In order to further his development he was drafted fourth overall by the then Kootenay Ice in the 2019 CHL Import Draft. Moving to North America he played in the Western Hockey League for the inaugural season with the Winnipeg Ice in 2019–20, posting 29 goals and 63 points in 53 games.

On 11 April 2020, Teplý was signed by the Chicago Blackhawks to a three-year, entry-level contract. With the following 2020–21 North American season set to be delayed due to the COVID-19 pandemic, Teplý returned to his native Czech Republic to join BK Mladá Boleslav of the Czech Extraliga on loan from the Blackhawks on 6 September 2020.

Career statistics

Regular season and playoffs

International

References

External links
 

2001 births
Living people
HC Benátky nad Jizerou players
HC Bílí Tygři Liberec players
Chicago Blackhawks draft picks
Czech ice hockey left wingers
BK Havlíčkův Brod players
Sportspeople from Havlíčkův Brod
BK Mladá Boleslav players
Rockford IceHogs (AHL) players
HC Stadion Litoměřice players
Winnipeg Ice players
Czech expatriate ice hockey players in Canada
Czech expatriate ice hockey players in the United States